Big Five may refer to:

Animals 
 the Big Five, large African wild animals said to be most difficult to hunt: lion, leopard, rhinoceros, elephant and Cape buffalo
 Big Five animals of the Kaziranga National Park, Assam, India: Indian rhinoceros, Indian elephant, Bengal tiger, swamp deer and wild water buffalo
 Big Five animals of Alaska, United States: bears, moose, reindeer, Dall sheep and wolves
 the Big Five fish UK consumers overwhelmingly eat: Atlantic cod, haddock, Atlantic salmon, tuna and prawns.

Arts and entertainment 

 Big Five (Eurovision), the five main sponsoring countries of the Eurovision Song Contest: France, Germany, Italy, Spain and the UK
 Big Five Academy Awards, the five main award categories
 Big Five (orchestras), the traditional top five orchestras of the United States
 Big Five (Yu-Gi-Oh!), a group of fictional characters in the Yu-Gi-Oh! universe
 The "Big Five" largest UK ITV companies: 
 Big Five (publishers) in English-language book publishing: Hachette, Holtzbrinck Publishing Group/Macmillan, Penguin Random House, HarperCollins and Simon & Schuster
 Toho's Big Five Kaiju: Godzilla, Mothra, King Ghidorah, Rodan and Mechagodzilla
 Big Five (album), a 1972 album by Prince Buster
 Big Five, the national performing arts companies of Scotland
 The Five (composers), also known as the Mighty Handful, group of 19th century Russian composers
 The Big Five (film studios) – The five major films studios: Universal Pictures, Paramount Pictures, Warner Bros. Pictures, Walt Disney Pictures, Columbia Pictures

Business 

 Big Five (banks), the five largest banks in Canada
 Big Five (Hawaii), an oligarchy of five corporations that ruled over Hawaii
 Big Five (technology companies), a name given to Big Tech companies in the 2010s (Alphabet (Google), Amazon, Apple, Meta (Facebook), and Microsoft)
 Big Five auditors, a group of accounting firms that have since been reduced to the Big Four
 Big Five auto shows: Detroit, Frankfurt, Geneva, Paris, Tokyo
 Big Five law firms, the five largest law firms of South Africa
 Big Five Software, 1980s game developer
 Big 5 Sporting Goods, a publicly traded (NASDAQ) sporting goods company
 The Big 5, the largest construction event in the Middle East, Africa and South Asia

Government and politics 

 Big Five (California politics), an informal institution of California's government
 Big Five (Germany), the five major metropolitan regions in Germany
 Big Five (Scotland Yard), a group of five senior Metropolitan Police detectives called upon to conduct investigations throughout Britain
 Big Five of Bayview, a group of political activists in the Bayview-Hunters Point neighborhood of San Francisco
 A colloquial name to refer to the five permanent members of the United Nations Security Council (United States, United Kingdom, France, China, Russia), or the five leading powers of the preceding League of Nations (United States, United Kingdom, France, Italy, Japan)

Sports 

 Big Five (Argentine football), the leading teams of Argentine football
 "Big Five" or Power Five conferences, a group of U.S. college sports conferences that are larger than the other "Group of Five conferences"
 Big Five Conference, a name used by the Athletic Association of Western Universities, now known as the Pac-12 Conference, from 1959 to 1962
 Philadelphia Big 5, an association of college athletic programs in and near Philadelphia, mostly referencing the men's basketball programs of said schools

Science and technology 

 Big5, a character encoding method for Traditional Chinese characters
 Big Five personality traits, a theoretical construct which describes human personality as organized along five dimensions or factors
 Big Five Weapons, five biological weapons developed by the United States Army
 The five major extinction events since life on Earth began
 The big five subsystems of second order arithmetic in reverse mathematics
 Rule of big 5, an expansion of the rule of three in C++11

Other uses 

 Five Families, a group of crime families in New York, United States
 Oceanic Big 5, a project for cleaning up the oceans

See also 

 Big One (disambiguation)
 Big Two (disambiguation)
 Big Three (disambiguation)
 Big Four (disambiguation)
 Big Six (disambiguation)
 Big Seven (disambiguation)
 Big Eight (disambiguation)
 Big Ten (disambiguation)
 Big 12
 Big 16